Don Leslie may refer to:

 Donald Leslie (1911–2004), American audio engineer
 Don Leslie (actor) (born 1948), actor and voice artist